Lucas Chanavat (born 17 December 1994) is a French cross-country skier who represents the club Le Grand Bornand.

He competed at the FIS Nordic World Ski Championships 2017 in Lahti, Finland.

Cross-country skiing results
All results are sourced from the International Ski Federation (FIS).

Olympic Games

Distance reduced to 30 km due to weather conditions.

World Championships

World Cup

Season standings

Individual podiums
2 victories – (2 ) 
15 podiums – (11 , 4 )

Team podiums
1 victory – (1 ) 
3 podiums – (3 )

References

External links

1994 births
Living people
French male cross-country skiers
Sportspeople from Haute-Savoie
Cross-country skiers at the 2018 Winter Olympics
Cross-country skiers at the 2022 Winter Olympics
Olympic cross-country skiers of France
Competitors at the 2015 Winter Universiade
20th-century French people
21st-century French people